Ingleside is an unincorporated community in Queen Anne's County, Maryland, United States. Ingleside has a post office with ZIP code 21644.

Amelia Earhart's visit
Published in The Centreville Observer on  November 12, 1936.

References

Unincorporated communities in Queen Anne's County, Maryland
Unincorporated communities in Maryland